Many places in Nepal have been given name based on mythology and other references. These original names eventually turned to give the present names. However, there prevail more than one saying on picking the origin of the names.

Different places have picked names from different languages. The preference of language depends upon the native language of the place / region. Looking towards the ancient history of Nepal, Sanskrit has been the most important sources for deriving words in Nepali Language. However Urdu, Pharasi, Hindi, English-language words are being imported too.

Places and their origin of name

Names of places in Asia
Placename etymologies
Lists of place name etymologies